The Lost Bridegroom a 1916 American silent comedy film produced by Adolph Zukor starring John Barrymore. Appearing alongside Barrymore in this film is his first wife Katherine Corri Harris. It was based on the short story titled "The Man Who Was Lost" by Willard Mack with James Kirkwood as its director. The film had the alternative title His Lost Self and was rereleased by Paramount on April 17, 1919 as part of their "Success Series", a celebration of some of the company's early screen triumphs. Though it obviously still existed by 1919, it is a lost silent film today.

Production
Director James Kirkwood later stated that Barrymore was binge drinking during the making of this film, and spent a large amount of time downing drinks in a saloon. These delays caused the production to drag (thus costs go up), so Kirkwood went down to the saloon and 'motioned' to Barrymore to either return to work or that he would sling the actor over his shoulders and carry him back to the set to finish filming.

Cast
John Barrymore as Bertie Joyce
Katherine Corri Harris as Dorothy Hardin (credited as Katherine Harris Barrymore)
Ida Darling as Mrs. Amelia Hardin
June Dale as Madge McQuirk
Hardee Kirkland as Black McQuirk
Eddie Sturgis as Slim Denny (credited as Edward Sturgis)
John T. Dillon as Crook
Tammany Young as Crook
Fred Williams

Uncredited 
James Kirkwood
William Sherwood

See also
John Barrymore filmography

References

External links

Pictorial History of the Silent Screen; still of Barrymore and a canine who appeared in the film

1916 films
American silent feature films
Films based on short fiction
Lost American films
Films directed by James Kirkwood Sr.
1916 comedy films
American black-and-white films
Silent American comedy films
1910s American films